Rubén Humberto Aguiar (born July 21, 1956) is a retired male marathon runner from Argentina, who won the first edition of the Buenos Aires Marathon in 1984. He represented his native country in the men's marathon at the 1984 Summer Olympics in Los Angeles, California.

Achievements
All results regarding marathon, unless stated otherwise

References
 sports-reference

1956 births
Living people
Argentine male marathon runners
Athletes (track and field) at the 1984 Summer Olympics
Olympic athletes of Argentina